The 1971 World Table Tennis Championships women's doubles was the 30th edition of the women's doubles championship.
Lin Huiqing and Zheng Minzhi defeated Mieko Hirano and Reiko Sakamoto in the final by three sets to nil.

Results

See also
List of World Table Tennis Championships medalists

References

-
1971 in women's table tennis